The 15th Canadian Folk Music Awards were scheduled to presented on April 3 and 4, 2020 in Charlottetown, Prince Edward Island. This represents the first time in the history of the awards that the organizing committee decided to present the awards in the spring rather than the fall, and thus the first time that the awards have been presented since November 2018. On March 13, however, the organizing committee announced the cancellation of the ceremony due to the emergence of the COVID-19 pandemic in Canada; instead, the winners were announced via live streaming on April 4.

Performers were scheduled to include Vishtèn, Kaia Kater, Ayrad, Tri-Continental, Lennie Gallant, Abigail Lapell and Le Vent du Nord.

Nominations were announced on November 20, 2019.

Nominees and recipients
Recipients are listed first and highlighted in boldface.

References

External links
 Canadian Folk Music Awards

15
Canadian Folk Music Awards
Canadian Folk Music Awards 15
Canadian Folk Music
Canadian Folk Music Awards
Canadian Folk Music Awards